Janusz Władysław Zemke (pronounced ; born 24 February 1949, Kowalewo Pomorskie) is a Polish politician. He was elected to the Sejm on 25 September 2005, getting 33,672 votes in 4 Bydgoszcz district as a candidate from the Democratic Left Alliance list.

He was a member of PRL Sejm 1989-1991, Sejm 1991-1993, Sejm 1993-1997, Sejm 1997-2001, and Sejm 2001-2005.

See also
Members of Polish Sejm 2005-2007

External links
Official site
Janusz Zemke - parliamentary page - includes declarations of interest, voting record, and transcripts of speeches.

1949 births
Living people
People from Golub-Dobrzyń County
Democratic Left Alliance politicians
Members of the Polish Sejm 1991–1993
Members of the Polish Sejm 1993–1997
Members of the Polish Sejm 1997–2001
Members of the Polish Sejm 2001–2005
Members of the Polish Sejm 2005–2007
Democratic Left Alliance MEPs
MEPs for Poland 2009–2014
MEPs for Poland 2014–2019
Members of the Polish Sejm 2007–2011
Nicolaus Copernicus University in Toruń alumni